Rosey binti Haji Yunus (born 16 January 1956) is a Malaysian politician from the Parti Pesaka Bumiputera Bersatu (PBB), a component party of the ruling Gabungan Parti Sarawak (GPS) coalition who has served as the State Deputy Minister of Women, Family, Welfare, Community Wellbeing and Childhood Development of Sarawak in charge of Women, Family and Childhood Development in the Barisan Nasional (BN) and GPS state administrations under Premiers Abdul Taib Mahmud, Adenan Satem and Abang Abdul Rahman Johari Abang Openg as well as Minister Fatimah Abdullah since September 2011 and Member of the Sarawak State Legislative Assembly (MLA) for Bekenu since May 2006.

Education
Rosey graduated from the University of Malaya with a Bachelor of Arts (BA) (Hons) majoring in linguistic art with upper second-class honours and a Diploma of Education in 1980.

Political career
Rosey was first elected assemblywoman for Bekenu in the 2006 Sarawak state election. In 2011, she successfully defended her seat in the following elections with an increased majority and was appointed as Assistant Minister for the newly-created Ministry of Welfare, Women & Family Development.

Rosey was formerly a member of the Sarawak Progressive Democratic Party (SPDP) before joining then-president William Mawan Ikom and three other assemblymen in leaving the party in 2014.

Election results

Honours
  :
  Meritorious Service Medal-Silver Civil Administration Medal (Sarawak) (PPB)
  Companion of the Order of the Star of Hornbill Sarawak (JBK) (2010)
  Commander of the Order of the Star of Hornbill Sarawak (PGBK) - Datuk (2020)

See also
 Bekenu (state constituency)

References

Living people
1956 births
University of Malaya alumni
21st-century Malaysian politicians
Parti Pesaka Bumiputera Bersatu politicians
Members of the Sarawak State Legislative Assembly
Commanders of the Order of the Star of Hornbill Sarawak
Companions of the Order of the Star of Hornbill Sarawak
Women MLAs in Sarawak
People from Sarawak
Progressive Democratic Party (Malaysia) politicians
Malaysian people of Malay descent
21st-century Malaysian women politicians